Comunicar is a quarterly peer-reviewed open access academic journal covering research on education, communication, and social sciences. Articles are published in Spanish and English and have abstracts in Chinese and Portuguese. The journal was established in 1993 and is published by Grupo Comunicar. Since 2016 it is published quarterly. Its editor-in-chief is Ignacio Aguaded. The journal is abstracted and indexed in the Social Sciences Citation Index and Scopus. According to the Journal Citation Reports, the journal has a 2016 impact factor of 2.212.

History 
The journal was first published by Grupo Comunicar, non-profit professional association of researchers in communication and education, established in Spain in 1989.

Types of articles
The journal is structured in two sections: 

 Monographic Dossier: Monographic articles on topics of the intersection of media and education. 
 Kaleidoscope: Miscellaneous section dedicated to research on various topics related to communication and education, as well as reports, studies, proposals and state-of-the-art articles on these same topics.

References

External links

Education journals
Multilingual journals
Quarterly journals
Publications established in 1993